Rui Jorge de Sousa Dias Macedo de Oliveira  (born 27 March 1973), known as Rui Jorge, is a Portuguese retired footballer who played as a left-back, currently manager of the Portugal national under-21 team.

In a 15-year professional career he spent 14 seasons in Primeira Liga, mainly in representation of Porto and Sporting CP, playing 292 matches and scoring seven goals in the competition.

Rui Jorge appeared with Portugal at the 2002 World Cup and two European Championships. He later managed the under-21 team for over a decade.

Club career
Rui Jorge was born in Vila Nova de Gaia, Porto District. Having emerged through local FC Porto, he made his professional debut with Rio Ave F.C. in the second division, returning to his first club in 1992 after one season. Never an undisputed starter with the former (only appearing in more than 20 games twice over a six-year spell) he did help the northern side to five Primeira Liga championships and three domestic cups.

In July 1998, Rui Jorge signed with Sporting CP, where he would remain for the following seven years, being first choice during most of his stint and adding two more leagues to his trophy cabinet, with the double being conquered in 2002. In the 2005–06 campaign he played with another Lisbon team, C.F. Os Belenenses, subsequently retiring from the game – aged 33, with more than 400 official appearances – and joining his final club's youth coaching staff.

In May 2009, Rui Jorge was appointed Belenenses' head coach for the final two matches of the season, taking over from Jaime Pacheco after a 0–5 home loss against S.C. Braga, with the team eventually ranking second from bottom (being later reinstated). At the end of the campaign, he returned to the youth ranks.

International career
Rui Jorge played for the Portugal under-21 side which lost the 1994 UEFA European Championship final to Italy (1–2) and the Olympic team who finished fourth at the 1996 Summer Olympics in the United States. He also had 45 caps at full level, two while at Porto and 43 when with Sporting, and scored once in a 7–1 away win over Andorra on 1 September 2001. His first game for the latter was a 0–0 draw with Norway on 20 April 1994 in a friendly match, and he represented his country at UEFA Euro 2000, the 2002 FIFA World Cup and Euro 2004.

Rui Jorge's participation at Euro 2004 on home soil was jeopardised when he tested positive in February that year for Budesonide, commercially known as Pulmicort. He said that the substance came from a medically recommended spray for his rhinitis. His suspension was lifted in May, with the fault placed on Sporting for not notifying authorities of his medical exemption; at the tournament, he was one of four players – three from defence – dropped by Luiz Felipe Scolari after the opening 2–1 loss to Greece, and did not return for the remainder of the competition, which Portugal lost in the final to the same team.

Managerial career
On 19 November 2010, Rui Jorge replaced Oceano at the helm of the Portuguese under-21s. He led them to the 2015 European Championships in the Czech Republic after ten wins in as many matches in the qualifying phase, and coached them to the second place in the finals after a penalty shootout defeat against Sweden.

Rui Jorge coached the Portuguese at the 2016 Olympic tournament in Brazil, where they lost 4–0 to Germany in the quarter-finals. He was also in charge for the 2017 edition of the under-21 continental tournament, which ended in group stage exit. On 10 October 2017, six years after the last loss for that stage of the competition, he was on the bench as the team lost 1–3 in Bosnia and Herzegovina for the 2019 European Championship qualifiers.

In November 2020, having already qualified for the 2021 European Championship, Rui Jorge celebrated a decade in the job; at that point he was the most experienced under-21 manager in Europe, and had served longer than all but four senior managers in the world. At the finals in Hungary and Slovenia the following June, his team finished as runners-up.

Career statistics

Club

International goals

|}

Managerial statistics

Honours

Player
Porto
Primeira Liga: 1992–93, 1994–95, 1995–96, 1996–97, 1997–98
Taça de Portugal: 1993–94, 1997–98
Supertaça Cândido de Oliveira: 1993, 1994, 1996; Runner-up 1992, 1995, 1997

Sporting CP
Primeira Liga: 1999–2000, 2001–02
Taça de Portugal: 2001–02; Runner-up 1999–2000
Supertaça Cândido de Oliveira: 2000, 2002
UEFA Cup runner-up: 2004–05

Manager
Portugal
UEFA European Under-21 Championship runner-up: 2015, 2021

Orders
 Medal of Merit, Order of the Immaculate Conception of Vila Viçosa (House of Braganza)

References

External links

1973 births
Living people
Sportspeople from Vila Nova de Gaia
Portuguese footballers
Association football defenders
Primeira Liga players
Liga Portugal 2 players
FC Porto players
Rio Ave F.C. players
Sporting CP footballers
C.F. Os Belenenses players
Portugal under-21 international footballers
Portugal international footballers
UEFA Euro 2000 players
2002 FIFA World Cup players
UEFA Euro 2004 players
Olympic footballers of Portugal
Footballers at the 1996 Summer Olympics
Portuguese football managers
Primeira Liga managers
C.F. Os Belenenses managers
Doping cases in association football
Portuguese sportspeople in doping cases